Extraordinary Mission is a 2017 Chinese crime action drama film directed by Alan Mak and Anthony Pun. It was released in China on 31 March 2017.

Plot
The film tells the story of an undercover police officer, Lin Kai (Huang Xuan), who accepts an assignment to take down a drug trafficking syndicate from the inside. His mission takes him to the Golden Triangle, where a heroin grower has been holding a police officer prisoner for ten years.

Cast
Huang Xuan as Lin Kai
Duan Yihong as Eagle
Lang Yueting as Qingshui
David Wang as Luo Dongfeng
Zu Feng as Li Jianguo
Wang Yanhui 
Ding Yongdai as Zhang Haitao
Xiao Cong as Yang Bin
Li Xiaochuan as Xiao Bei
Zhao Bingrui as Wang Bo
Dai Lele as Lin Kai's mother
Tao Hai as Ruling elder

Reception
The film has grossed  in China.

Awards and nominations

References

External links

Films directed by Alan Mak
Chinese crime drama films
Chinese action drama films
2017 crime drama films
2017 action drama films
Films about heroin addiction
Films about the illegal drug trade
Films about police officers
Films set in China
Films set in Thailand